Date Township is a township in Texas County, in the U.S. state of Missouri.

Date Township was erected in 1896, taking its name from a community of the same name within its borders. The exact location of the extinct community of Date is unknown to the GNIS.

References

Townships in Missouri
Townships in Texas County, Missouri